The Atchison Huskers were a minor league baseball team based in Atchison, Kansas. In 1897 and 1898, the Atchison Huskers played exclusively as members of the Class D level Kansas State League, winning the 1897 league championship. Atchison hosted minor league home games at Forest Park.

History
Minor league baseball in Atchison, Kansas began during the 1897 season. The Atchison "Huskers" played as members of the four–team Class D level Kansas State League. The Emporia Maroons, Junction City Parrots and Topeka Colts joined Atchison in league play.

It was reported the Kansas State League formed from the Northern Kansas League during the 1897 season, with the Atchison Huskers franchise replacing the Minneapolis, Kansas team.

Beginning league play on June 21, 1897, Atchison ended the season as Kansas State League champions, as the league ended play on July 7, 1897. With a record of 8–3, the Huskers finished the season in 1st place, playing under managers Cole and Franklin Mitchell. Atchison finished 2.5 games behind the 2nd place Junction City Parrotts in the final standings.

In 1898, the Atchison Huskers continued play in the Kansas State League in their final season, with the league beginning play on July 24, 1898. Ending the season with a record of 4–5, playing under manager Charlie Cole, Atchison finished the season in 3rd place, 3.5 games behind the 1st place Salina Blues. Ending league play on August 10, 1898 the Kansas State League folded, reportedly after Salina and Atchison both dissolved due to finances. The Kansas State League did not return to play in 1899.

Atchison, Kansas has not hosted another minor league team.

The ballpark
The Atchison Huskers teams hosted minor league home games at Forest Park. Photographs from the era show Forest Park to be a public park with amenities.

Timeline

Year–by–year records

Notable alumni

Harry Berte (1898)
Billy Kinloch (1898)
Fred Raymer (1898)
Elmer Stricklett (1898)

See also
Atchison Huskers players

References

External references
Baseball Reference

Defunct minor league baseball teams
Defunct baseball teams in Kansas
Baseball teams established in 1897
Baseball teams disestablished in 1898
Kansas State League teams
Atchison County, Kansas